The Wesleyan Cardinals football team represents Wesleyan University in the sport of American football. It is a member of the Division III New England Small College Athletic Conference (NESCAC) and competes against traditional Little Three rivals Amherst and Williams. 

Wesleyan is one of the 39 founding members of the NCAA. The Cardinals’ home field, Andrus Field, is the oldest continuously used American football field in the world.  Andrus Field is also the oldest continuously used baseball field in the world as the Wesleyan baseball team also uses Andrus Field.

Notable players
 Bill Belichick: head coach of the New England Patriots of the National Football League (NFL)
 Eric Mangini: former head coach of the NFL's New York Jets and Cleveland Browns and NFL analyst for ESPN and Fox Sports 1
 Jeff Wilner: first Wesleyan graduate to play for an NFL team; played tight end for the Green Bay Packers and Denver Broncos from 1994 to 1996
 Field Yates: analyst on ESPN and former member of the coaching staff of the Kansas City Chiefs

References

External links
 

 
1875 establishments in Connecticut
American football teams established in 1875